The Tulare Formation is a  Pliocene to Holocene epoch geologic formation in the central and southern San Joaquin Valley of central California.

Geology

Its sediments consist mainly of unconsolidated deposits of clay, silt, sand, and gravel.

Fossils
Many freshwater fossils are preserved in the formation, dating back to the Neogene and Quaternary Periods of the Cenozoic Era. They include the largest fossil assemblage of clams and snails known on the Pacific Coast.

See also

 
 List of fossiliferous stratigraphic units in California
 Paleontology in California

References

Neogene California
Pleistocene California
Quaternary California
Geography of the San Joaquin Valley
Geology of Fresno County, California
Geology of Kern County, California
Geology of Tulare County, California
Geography of Kings County, California
Holocene geology
Pleistocene geology
Pliocene geology
Geologic formations of California